The 1941 DePauw Tigers football team was an American football team that represented Butler University as a member of the Indiana Intercollegiate Conference (IIC) during the 1941 college football season. In its 12th season under head coach Ray "Gaumy" Neal, the team compiled a 6–2 record.

The team played its home games at the newly constructed Ira B. Blackstock Memorial Stadium in Greencastle, Indiana. The stadium was built at a cost of $80,000. The stadium was a gift from the widow of Ira B. Blackstock, a DePauw alumnus and university trustee who died in 1931.

Four DePauw players were selected by The Indianapolis News to its All-Indiana college football teams: guard George Crane (1st team); back Arthur Lavidge (2nd team); tackle James Highland (3rd team); and back Mike Melinki (3rd team).

Schedule

Roster
The roster of the 1941 DePauw team included the following players:
 Willard Becker, center, 5'10", 155 pounds
 Max Biggs, end, 6'1", 170 pounds
 Howard Blomgren, guard, 5'10", 165 pounds
 Dick Brown, tackle, 5'10", 183 pounds
 Warren Brown, back, 5'7", 154 pounds
 J.B. Campbell, guard, 5'8", 170 pounds
 George Christie, back, 5'7", 158 pounds
 George Crane, guard, 6'1", 193 pounds
 John Dewar, back, 5'9", 170 pounds
 Edmund Donk, back, 6', 170 pounds
 Bob Earhart, guard, 5'9", 171 pounds
 William Fischer, tackle, 6'2", 198 pounds
 Don Galbraith, back, 5'10", 180 pounds
 Fred Garlock, end, 5'9", 156 pounds
 Larry Hankes, back, 5'10", 162 pounds
 Carl Hein, tackle, 6', 160 pounds
 Al Hermeling, tackle, 6'1", 170 pounds
 James Highland, tackle, 6', 202 pounds
 Frank Hitchings, back, 5'7", 145 pounds
 Roger Holcomb, end, 6'2", 174 pounds
 Fred Howat, back, 5'10", 145 pounds
 John Jenkins, guard, 5'9", 160 pounds
 Harry Johnson, end, 6'2", 183 pounds
 John Jones, end, 6'1", 180 pounds
 Marvin Kishler, center, 5'11", 152 pounds
 Arthur Lavidge, back, 6', 182 pounds
 John Long, back, 6'1", 185 pounds
 Richard McCally, guard, 5'11" 165 pounds
 Mike Milenki, back, 6'7", 163 pounds
 Ray Moehring, tackle, 6'2", 197 pounds
 Brad Phillips, center, 5'8", 170 pounds
 Charles Rose, back, 6', 170 pounds
 Bud Sherrow, guard, 5'11", 165 pounds
 Edward Stokes, center, 5'11", 170 pounds
 Guy Walker, back, 6'3", 185 pounds
 Carl Woesner, end, 6', 174 pounds
 Art Zwerlein, tackle, 6'3", 183 pounds

References

DePauw
DePauw Tigers football seasons
DePauw Tigers football